Laurens, New York may refer to:

 Laurens (town), New York, Otsego County
 Laurens (village), New York, Otsego County